The PEF Survey of Palestine was a series of surveys carried out by the Palestine Exploration Fund (PEF) between 1872 and 1877 for the Survey of Western Palestine and in 1880 for the Survey of Eastern Palestine. The survey was carried out after the success of the Ordnance Survey of Jerusalem by the newly-founded PEF, with support from the War Office. Twenty-six sheets were produced for "Western Palestine" and one sheet for "Eastern Palestine". It was the first fully scientific mapping of Palestine.

Besides being a geographic survey the group collected thousands of place names with the objective of identifying Biblical, Talmudic, early Christian and Crusading locations. The survey resulted in the publication of a map of Palestine consisting of 26 sheets, at a scale of 1:63,360, the most detailed and accurate map of Palestine published in the 19th century. The PEF survey represented the peak of the cartographic work in Palestine in the nineteenth century.

Although the holiness of Palestine was a significant motivator for many members of the PEF, the allocation of British Army Royal Engineers to carry out the survey was a result of British strategic interests, particularly the proximity of the Suez Canal.

Nur Masalha posited that the popularity of the publications led to a growth in Zionism amongst Jews.

It was the most influential and reliable map of Palestine until the British Mandate's Survey of Palestine, which began half a century later.

War Office involvement
As a result of the French survey work in Galilee in 1870, Charles Wilson joined the Topographical Department of the Intelligence Department of the War Office in London. In addition, the outbreak of the Russo-Turkish War (1877–1878) provided another strategic imperative for the British Government to ensure the completion of the survey work. Colonel Home of the British War Office wrote in May 1877: "If Russia occupies Turkish Armenia she will have the two valleys of the Euphrates and Tigris at her disposal and she will completely dominate the Gulf of Seuderum if indeed she does not occupy it. Syria especially the Valley of the Jordan will become of great importance as offering the easiest road for an advance on the Suez Canal - under such circumstances it is of the utmost importance that we should have good maps of the country."

John James Moscrop illustrated the nature of the involvement of the War Office in the survey work, in a detailed monograph. The success of the survey resulted from the War Office providing support to the PEF, and the PEF providing cover to the War Office. Haim Goren's review summarized it as follows: 
Moscrop takes considerable pains to show how the different governmental bodies, particularly the War Office, were involved in all stages of the Survey of Western Palestine. He shows how Wilson was in practice serving as liaison between the government and the Palestine Exploration Fund's Executive Committee, of which he was a member... He also describes how general publication of the maps and memoirs was held back until the War Office had finished with them for its own purposes. Finally, Moscrop re-examines the payments made by the Fund to those involved in the survey. Revealingly, he finds that for most of the relevant period there is no mention of any payments for the salaries of the Royal Engineers. It has to be supposed that the money came from a quite different source-that from which the men's salaries had always come, namely the War Office in London. 

The “Survey of Eastern Palestine” was abandoned partly due to a change of priority for the British Government, who became focused on the events building up to the British Conquest of Egypt (1882). Moscrop writes: “The abandonment of the Eastern Survey does demonstrate the close linkage between the War Office, the Intelligence Department, and the Fund and the fact that this survey like its predecessor, the Western Survey, was not an independent survey run by the fund.”

The surveys

The majority of the work of the survey was carried out by the Royal Engineers. In addition to the extensive maps, the Palestine Exploration Fund published three copious volumes of the field work conducted by Conder and Kitchener, known as The Survey of Western Palestine (Memoirs of the Tography, Orography, Hydrgraphy, and Archæology), wherein are detailed accounts of every hill range, stream, spring, village, town, ruin, and large buildings in Palestine, as also notes of every statement as to topography gathered by C.R. Conder from Jewish, Samaritan, Greek, Latin, and Norman French notices of Palestine, with contributions touching on the topography of Palestine found in Josephus, the Bible, Pliny, Strabo, the Rabbinical writers, the Samaritan chroniclers, the Onomasticon, the early Christian pilgrims, and the Crusading and Arab chronicles. A fourth work published by E.H. Palmer, and which includes Arabic nomenclature collected by Conder and Kitchener for the PEF, is The Survey of Western Palestine - Arabic and English Name Lists.

Jerusalem survey and excavations
The PEF surveyors, led by Charles Warren, carried out survey and excavation work in Jerusalem between spring 1867 and April 1870, building on the 1864-65 Ordnance Survey of Jerusalem.

During his three periods of residence in the region (1865–72, 1873–74 and 1881–82), Charles Simon Clermont-Ganneau led a few discrete pieces of survey work that were carried out for and published by the PEF.

Western Palestine survey
The initial survey group arrived in Jaffa in early November 1871 led by Captain Richard Warren Stewart; Charles Francis Tyrwhitt-Drake joined the group on 17 December, around which time Captain Stewart fell ill and returned to Britain. 23 year-old Lieutenant Claude Reignier Conder joined to lead the group on 17 July 1872, prior to which 560 sqm had been surveyed.

An aggregate total of 1,250 sqm had been surveyed by the end of December 1872, 1,800 by 8 June 1873, 2,300 sqm by 22 January 1874, and 3,000 by 23 April 1874. Tyrwhitt-Drake died from fever (thought to be malaria) on 23 June 1874, and on 19 Nov 1874, 24 year-old Lieutenant Herbert Kitchener joined to replace him.

3,500 sqm had been surveyed by 8 December 1874, and 4,700 by 30 June 1875. The survey was suspended for 15 months following an incident in July 1875 when its members were attacked near Safad by a group of Algerians. Kitchener returned to the region, completing the remainder of the survey between 27 February 1877 and 27 September, with a total surveyed area of 6,040 sqm.

Eastern Palestine survey
The survey was carried out between August and October 1881 by a team led by Captain Conder. They surveyed 510 sqm of barely populated land, covering an area which included Amman, then an almost uninhabited set of Roman ruins, and the recently repopulated Madaba.

Leadership
The survey was led at different times by four senior Royal Engineers:
Captain Wilson (later Col. Sir Charles Wilson, who in 1885 led the final stage of the Nile Expedition);
Captain Warren (later General Sir Charles Warren, who in 1888 was the Commissioner of the London Police Force during the Jack the Ripper murder investigation);
Lieutenant Conder (later Colonel Conder, who became a prolific author on Ancient Middle Eastern history, and almost a century after his death was accused of being Jack the Ripper); and
Lieutenant Kitchener (later Field Marshal Lord Kitchener, and the British Secretary of State for War at the beginning of World War I).

Gallery

Composite maps

26 Maps of Western Palestine
The twenty-six sheets of the map

Eastern Palestine

Surveying

General references

Primary sources

Survey of Western Palestine
Introduction, by Trelawney Saunders (1881)
1.I. Galilee, by Conder and Kitchener (1881) 
1.II. Samaria, by Conder and Kitchener (1882)
1.III. Judaea, by Conder and Kitchener (1883)
2. Special Papers on Topography, Archæology, Manners and Customs, Etc, contributed by Wilson, Warren, Conder, Kitchener, Edward Henry Palmer; Mr. George Smith; Rev. Greville Chester; Charles Simon Clermont-Ganneau (1881)
3. Jerusalem, by Warren and Conder (1884)
Plans, elevations, sections, etc. shewing the results of the excavations at Jerusalem, 1867-70, by Warren (1884)
4. The Fauna and Flora of Palestine, by Henry Baker Tristram (1885)
5. Memoir on the Physical Geology and Geography, by Edward Hull (1886)
Arabic and English Name Lists, Edward Henry Palmer (1881)
General Index, by Henry C. Stewardson (1888)

Survey of Eastern Palestine
Survey of Eastern Palestine, by Conder (1889)

Memoirs

Secondary sources

Citations

External links 

19th-century maps and globes
Old maps of Jerusalem
Palestine Exploration Fund
1880s works
Maps of Palestine (region)